The Sahafi Hotel in Mogadishu, Somalia was attacked by al-Shabaab bombers and gunmen on 1 November 2015 and 9 November 2018.

2015 attack
At dawn on 1 November 2015, a suicide car bombing occurred at the Sahafi Hotel in Mogadishu, Somalia, after which gunmen entered it. First responders arrived and were targeted with two more bombs. The attackers killed at least 15 people, including a former commander of the Somali National Army, the owner of the hotel, a freelance journalist and a member of parliament. Nine attackers were killed: three in the bombings and six shot dead by soldiers. Jihadist group al-Shabaab claimed responsibility for the attack.

2018 attack
On 9 November 2018, a triple car bombing occurred outside the Sahafi Hotel, killing 52 people, including the owner, who was the son of the owner who was killed in the 2015 attack. About 100 others were injured. Five attackers wearing police uniforms were shot dead by police as they tried to enter the hotel. Al-Shabaab claimed responsibility for the attack.

References

2015 murders in Somalia
2018 murders in Somalia
2010s crimes in Mogadishu
21st-century mass murder in Somalia
Al-Shabaab (militant group) attacks in Mogadishu
Attacks on buildings and structures in 2015
Attacks on buildings and structures in 2018
Attacks on buildings and structures in Mogadishu
Attacks on hotels in Somalia
Building bombings in Somalia
Hotel bombings
Improvised explosive device bombings in 2018
Mass murder in 2015
Mass murder in 2018
Mass murder in Mogadishu
November 2015 crimes in Africa
November 2015 events in Africa
November 2018 crimes in Africa
November 2018 events in Africa
Suicide bombings in 2015
Suicide bombings in Mogadishu
Suicide car and truck bombings in Somalia
Terrorist incidents in Somalia in 2015
Terrorist incidents in Somalia in 2018